Four Seasons Resort and Club Dallas at Las Colinas is a golf resort in  Irving, Texas, United States. The resort contains a 431-room hotel, two restaurants, lounge bars, a spa, swimming pool, gym, tennis courts and two golf courses, featuring a Tournament Players Club course, TPC Las Colinas, that hosted the PGA Tour's annual AT&T Byron Nelson. 

In 2022, it was announced that Partners Group and Trinity Fund Advisors acquired the property previously managed by Four Seasons Hotels and Resorts. In addition to being disclosed that the site would be managed by Ritz-Carlton, a series of investments was announced to renovate its structure, whose completion is scheduled for 2024.

Overview
The Four Seasons Club opened in 1983, while the adjoining hotel opened in 1986.

The property was sold in 2022 and will be rebranded The Las Colinas Resort, Dallas on December 15, 2022 and will maintain that name during a $55 million renovation, before it is renamed The Ritz-Carlton Dallas, Las Colinas in 2024.

Golf
The Four Seasons Resort and Club Dallas at Las Colinas is known for its golf facilities, which includes the TPC Las Colinas championship course that was designed by Jay Morrish in consultation with Byron Nelson and Ben Crenshaw. The course was constructed as a TPC stadium course, incorporating nine holes from the original Las Colinas Sports Club layout. Since it opened in 1983 (Crenshaw won the 1st event  see wall of champions inside the sports club), it has hosted the PGA Tour's Byron Nelson event from 1983 to 2017.

Starting in 1994, the PGA Tour has also made use of the resort's second course, Cottonwood Valley, for the first two rounds of the Byron Nelson Championship in order to lessen the impact of weather delays. This course was also designed by Jay Morrish this time alongside renowned golf course architect Robert Trent Jones, Jr.

The resort also includes the Byron Nelson Golf School, a driving range and other practice facilities.

Rating
The resort is the only AAA Five Diamond Award resort in Texas.

References

External links
 Four Seasons Resort and Club Dallas at Las Colinas official website
 The Las Colinas Resort, Dallas official website
  AT&T Byron Nelson Championship

Golf clubs and courses in Texas
Hotels in Texas
Sports in Irving, Texas
Buildings and structures in Irving, Texas
Tourist attractions in Dallas County, Texas
Four Seasons hotels and resorts
Hotel buildings completed in 1986
Hotels established in 1986
2022 mergers and acquisitions